Colegio de San José, also referred to by its acronym CSJ, is a private Catholic coeducational basic and higher education institution run by the Sisters of Charity of Saint Vincent De Paul in Jaro Iloilo City Philippines. It was established on July 9, 1871, and is the first Catholic school for girls in Western Visayas.

History

Founding
Colegio de San José had its beginning in 1872. Vincentian priest Fr. Ildefonso Moral, rector of the Jaro Archdiocesan Seminary, and Recardo Mascuñana signed the contract of its establishment on July 9, 1871.

On May 1, 1872, the Daughters of Charity opened a school to provide Christian education for girls. In 1877 they decided to give up the school for lack of resources. Bishop Mariano Cuartero of Jaro realized the need for the teaching and the catechetical services of the Sisters. So he gave them full charge of the Escuela Municipal, a free school for the poor, located at Sta. Isabel and Lopez Jaena Streets.

In 1881 another storey was added to the nuns' quarters to answer to the urgent request of the parents. A dormitory for girls and a chapel were inaugurated by Leandro Arrue, Bishop of Jaro.

In 1892 Domingo Viera and the mother superior of the Daughters of Charity Juana Goita, conceived the plan of constructing a college managed and owned by the Daughters of Charity. The Sisters were to continue managing the Escuela Municipal.

With the help of the higher Superiors and new loyal benefactors, the work immediately started. The site was located at East Lopez Street. Manuel Uytiepo aided the sisters in finishing the building. In spite of the interruption of the Revolution of 1896, the new Colegio de San Jose was inaugurated on March 19, 1896.

Along with the reconstruction of the building was the organization of the administration, re-examination of the education objectives, and adoption of new methods to suit the needs of the students. The curriculum included Reading, History, Writing, Arithmetic, Spanish Grammar, Practical Arts, and Religious and Moral Training. The emphasis was Christian formation and Christian manners and right conduct.

On September 14, 1917, five of the Sisters from Colegio de San José started the Colegio del Sagrado Corazon de Jesus in Iloilo City proper.

In 1926, the college was allowed to grant high school diplomas. Later on, it offered college courses like Music, Teacher Education, Secretarial and Commerce. Colegio de San Jose, the oldest school for girls in Western Visayas, had a complete library, a school of music, plus complete courses from pre-elementary to college.

Fire and new building

On August 30, 1958, the school was razed by fire of undetermined origin.  The Viritas, local newspaper, quoted that the burning of Colegio de San Jose was both material and historic loss to Iloilo. The history of the education and cultural works of the Daughters of charity of St. Vincent de Paul was destroyed.

In the early 1950s, the Escuela Municipal became a free school serving as a laboratory for the in-campus practice teaching of normal education students. It functioned and even flourished after the fire of 1958 the building having withstood the fire.

Church and government officials, heads of schools, superiors of the congregation like Ana Cassassas and Hermenegilda Beroiz and Zacariaz Zubinas, the whole Daughters of Charity province, lay benefactors and alumni all over the country, contributed to the rebuilding of the new college building. The new building was blessed by Jose Ma. Cuenco, Archbishop of Jaro on November 27, 1959.

After Ines Peña reconstructed the college and put things in order, Tarsila Palermo took over the management. During her term she also had the supervision of the opening of the Marillac Academy in Miag-ao, a sister institution of Colegio de San Jose. Concepcion Gotera who succeeded Palermo, carried on with the preparation of the school, until on September 6, 1969, it was officially opened. Then Ines Peña took over, followed by Soledad Torre.

March 1979 marked a new thrust in the administration of CSJ and other D.C. schools. A new vision systematized the management, supervision and administration of all D.C. schools was adopted. The Catholic School System Development Program was integrated in the Daughters of Charity Mission Statement.

School year 1981-1982 saw Colegio de San Jose making a forward thrust by opting for PAASCU accreditation. While the Basic Education Department had undergone and passed the Preliminary and Formal Survey, the College Department, in coordination with the faculty, students, personnel, parents, alumni and community launched the PAASCU Preliminary Survey on January 19–20, 1987.

Modernization

A Computer Laboratory was installed in 1988 and computer subjects were offered in all courses. In 1990, the Two-Year Computer Secretarial was offered with the new Bachelor of Science in Accountancy program. The computer facilities were upgraded in 1993, Computer Technology was added as a new major in the AB, BSED, BEED programs while Computer Management was added as a new major in the BSC program.

The best feature of the Basic Education Department is its Personalized Education Program as confirmed by PAASCU Re-accreditation in 1988 for Upper BED and in 1990 for Lower BED.

Through the support of the alumni, parents and students, a new four-storey building was inaugurated and blessed on November 24, 1991, by Most Reverend Alberto Piamonte, D.D. on the occasion of the 400th Birth Anniversary of St. Louise de Marillac. Dedicated to her, this building is now the College Building or the Higher Education Department.

A new audio-visual room was installed and blessed on November 28, 1991. In response to the increasing school population, Health Services Center was relocated in 1991. It was centrally located within the school campus where emergency needs can be adequately provided.

The 120th Foundation Anniversary of Colegio de San Jose was marked by the launching of Basic Ecclesial Communities on October 2, 1992. A big budgeted play titled Louise written and directed by Fr. James Reuter, S.J. shown on November 27–29, 1992, stole the limelight as it duplicated the success of a similar play produced in Manila by the DC schools.

Colegio de San Jose was chosen as a pilot school in 1993-94 for the Revised Religious Education Program in the DC Schools System.

In February 1994, the Upper Basic Education Department was successfully granted by PAASCU another five-year accredited status. Commendable is the sincere and earnest efforts of the Administration to work for Lay Empowerment wherein co-responsibility is given to lay partners.

Faced with challenge of the school's mission to build Christian Communities, the Faculty and Non-Teaching Personnel of Colegio de San Jose underwent series of retreats and seminars to prepare them to Basic Ecclesial Communities which have evidently strengthened the harmonious relationship between and among faculty members, administration, students and parents. This contributed greatly to the continual building up of Colegio de San Jose into a Christian-Vincentian community, developing in them a strong sense of dedication and spirit of service.

School year 1994-95 was geared toward PAASCU Re-Survey of the Lower Basic Education Department and Formal PAASCU Survey for the Higher Education Department. A three-year accredited status was granted by PAASCU to the Higher Education Department on April 21, 1995.

It is an ongoing concern of the administration to improve its facilities and provide better learning encounters for the clientele. During the school year 1994–1995, a new Reading Center and an office for the Student Personnel Services were installed. The Music Room had been relocated, and this revived students' potentials for music. Special courses in Piano, Guitar, Organ and Voice are offered.

In the same school year, initial efforts toward integrated administration between Colegio de San Jose and its sister school, Colegio del Sagrado Corazon de Jesus were effected to realize the SLMSS-DC school system approach. In this set-up, CSJ and CSCJ share a common president.

To respond to the needs of the growing population, a new three-storey building was inaugurated and blessed in June 1996. This is now the St. Joseph Building that houses the Lower Basic Education.

In summer 1996, Colegio de San Jose, in its efforts to continuously provide relevant quality education in answer to the demands of the times and advance in technology, started to extend its computer facilities to the larger community of offering short/special courses in computer. In like manner, the Higher Education enriched its curriculum during the school year 1996-1997 by offering Management Accounting as an additional major in the Commerce Program.

The continuing development of Colegio de San Jose is a collaborative effort of committed administration, faculty, personnel, students, parents, and alumni journeying together toward an integrated academic and non-academic programs with Christian formation as the core permeating all its activities.

Trivia
Philippine Revolutionary leader Teresa Magbanua taught at the Colegio for a period of time prior to her military career.

Educational institutions established in 1871
Schools in Iloilo City
1871 establishments in the Philippines